Glam is a shortened form of the word glamour.

Glam or GLAM may also refer to:
 GLAM (cultural heritage), an acronym for galleries, libraries, archives, and museums, the cultural heritage institutions
Glam.com, a life-style related Web company
 Glam (film), a 1997 experimental drama film

Bussineses
GLAM, an Malaysian fashion magazine

Education
 University of Glamorgan, founded in 1913 and merged into the University of South Wales in 2013.
 Generalized linear array model in statistics

People
 Moshe Glam (born 1970), Israeli footballer and football manager
 Rami Glam (born 1978), former Israeli footballer
 Glamourina (born 1988), Polish fashion stylist

Places
 Short form of Glamorgan a historic county of Wales and formerly used as a postal abbreviation.

Music
 Glam (album), by Mouse on Mars
 "Glam", a 2010 song by Christina Aguilera from Bionic
 "Glam", a 2014 song by Chuck Inglish from Convertibles
 "Glam", a 1982 instrumental by Icehouse from Primitive Man
 "Glam 25", a 1999 song by Zombie Nation from Leichenschmaus
 Glam (band), a South Korean girl group
 Glam rock, a style of rock and pop music
 Glam metal, a subgenre of heavy metal music
 Glam punk, a genre that mixes elements of glam rock with protopunk or punk rock

Sport
 Glamorgan Cricket Club, first-class county club representing Glamorgan, abbreviated as Glam
 Glamorgan Wanderers, Rugby union team in the county of Glamorgan

See also
 Glamorgan
 Glamorous (disambiguation)
 Glamour (disambiguation)